Qingdao Sports Centre Conson Gymnasium (official name) is an indoor sporting arena located in Qingdao, China, used mostly for basketball and arena football games. The capacity of the arena is 12,500 spectators.  It hosts indoor sporting events such as badminton, basketball, concerts, gymnastics, table tennis and volleyball.

Notable events
Super Show 3 - Super Junior The 3rd ASIA Tour, August 28, 2010, with a sold-out crowd of 12,000 people.
2011 Sudirman Cup
On 20 May 2017, Joker Xue, a Chinese singer-songwriter, headlined the arena as part of his I Think I've Seen You Somewhere Tour.

See also
 Qingdao Conson Stadium
 List of indoor arenas in China

References

External links

Arena information
Pictures of arena

Indoor arenas in China
Sports venues in Shandong
Sport in Qingdao
Buildings and structures in Qingdao
Sports venues completed in 2009